Suresh Chand Jain (5 December 1926 – 10 December 2009) was an Indian physicist and director of the Defence Research and Development Organization. Known for his research in solid state physics, Jain was an elected fellow of the Indian National Science Academy and National Academy of Sciences, India. In 1966, the Council of Scientific and Industrial Research, the apex agency of the Government of India for scientific research, awarded him the Shanti Swarup Bhatnagar Prize for Science and Technology, one of the highest Indian science awards for his contributions to physical sciences.

Biography 

S. C. Jain, born on 5 December 1926 in Saharanpur in the Indian state of Uttar Pradesh, earned an MSc degree in physics in 1949 and followed it up with a PhD in solid state physics from Delhi University in 1955, carrying out his research at the National Physical Laboratory, Delhi under Kariamanickam Srinivasa Krishnan. Subsequently, he moved to the UK to take up the position of a faculty member at University of Leeds and worked there until 1958. On his return to India, he joined the Indian Institute of Technology, Delhi where he served as the head of the department of physics from 1965 to 1968 and as the dean of faculty of science from 1966 to 1969. Concurrently, he worked at his alma mater, the National Physical Laboratory, and held the position of a deputy director during 1965–69, and as the director of Solid State Physics Laboratory (SSPL) during the period 1969–74. While heading the SSPL, he also held the directorship of the Defence Research and Development Organization (DRDO). In between, he did visiting professor assignments at University of Illinois, Atomic Energy Research Establishment and Imperial College of London (1975–77).

Jain died on 10 December 2009, at the age of 83.

Legacy 
During his doctoral studies, Jain assisted his mentor, K. S. Krishnan, the co-discoverer of the Raman Effect, on the thermal conductivity of solids. It was during this time, the duo developed a methodology for the measurement of thermal conductivity in solids at high temperatures which was published by them in an article, Thermionic Constants of Metals and Semiconductors. II. Metals of the First Transition Group in 1952 in Proceedings of the Royal Society of London. Series A, Mathematical and Physical Sciences and later explained further by way of another article, Determination of thermal conductivities at high temperatures in British Journal of Applied Physics in 1954. The measurement protocol later came to be known as the "Jain-Krishnan Method". Polar crystals, thin films and semiconductor devices are some of the other areas he worked on and he was credited with developing experimental techniques in these disciplines which are in use around the world. He also contributed to the development of electronic equipment for the military. His studies have been documented by way of a number of articles and he published four books viz. Recent advances in semiconductors: theory and technology, Nonmetallic crystals, Germanium-silicon strained layers and heterostructures, and Electronic absorption and internal and external vibrational data of atomic and molecular ions doped in alkali halide crystals.

Jain was the director of the International Advanced School on Theory and Technology of Semiconductors, an Indian Institute of Technology Delhi (IIT Delhi) program held in April 1968. He chaired the international conference on science and technology of non-metallic crystals held at IIT Delhi in January 1969 and was associated with International Union of Pure and Applied Physics as a member of its solid state commission. He was also a member of the editorial boards of journals such as Radiation Effects and Defects in Solids, Crystal Lattice Defects and Amorphous Materials and Journal of Nonmetals and was a senior member of the Institute of Electrical and Electronics Engineers.

Awards and honors 
The Council of Scientific and Industrial Research awarded Jain the Shanti Swarup Bhatnagar Prize, one of the highest Indian science awards in 1966 and the Indian National Science Academy elected him as a fellow in 1979. He was also a fellow of the National Academy of Sciences, India, Physical Society of London, American Physical Society, Faraday Society and Institution of Electronics and Telecommunication Engineers.

Selected bibliography

Books

Articles

See also 

 Nonmetal
 Thermionic emission

Notes

References 

1926 births
2009 deaths
20th-century Indian physicists
Scientists from Uttar Pradesh
Indian technology writers
People from Saharanpur
Delhi University alumni
Academics of the University of Leeds
Academic staff of IIT Delhi
Defence Research and Development Organisation
University of Illinois faculty
Academics of Imperial College London
Recipients of the Shanti Swarup Bhatnagar Award in Medical Science
Fellows of The National Academy of Sciences, India
Fellows of the Indian National Science Academy
Fellows of the American Physical Society